Nanqu or Nan Qu may refer to
Nánqǔ, another name for Nanguan music
Nanqu Subdistrict, Zhongshan
South District, Taichung
South District, Tainan

See also
Minami-ku (disambiguation), districts in Japan with similar names
Nam-gu (disambiguation), districts in South Korea with similar names